

Massachusetts 

Massachusetts law required a majority for election, necessitating additional trials in three districts.

See also 
 United States House of Representatives elections, 1796 and 1797
 List of United States representatives from Massachusetts

United States House of Representatives elections in Massachusetts
Massachusetts
Massachusetts
United States House of Representatives
United States House of Representatives